Jean-Charles Lapierre  (May 7, 1956 – March 29, 2016) was a Canadian politician and television and radio broadcaster.
After retiring from the government in 2007, he served as a political analyst in a variety of venues.

He was Paul Martin's Quebec lieutenant during the period of the Martin government. He was first elected to the House of Commons in 1978, serving from 1979 to 1993, and representing the riding of Shefford. He sat as a Liberal from 1979 to 1990, and later as an independent. He returned after an eleven-year absence, when he won a seat in the 2004 federal election for the Montreal riding of Outremont. On July 20, 2004, he was appointed to the Canadian Cabinet as Minister of Transport, serving until the 2006 election. Lapierre resigned as the MP for Outremont on January 28, 2007.

In 2016, Lapierre died on a private plane that crashed on approach to Îles-de-la-Madeleine Airport. Seven people died in the crash, including four of his family members; they were traveling to their father Raymond's funeral. Both pilots died.

Early life, education and marriage 
Born May 7, 1956, Jean Lapierre was the oldest son of Raymond and Lucie Lapierre. He had younger siblings: a sister Martine and brothers Marc and Louis Lapierre.

He married and had two children: Marie-Anne and Jean-Michel Lapierre. Later, the couple divorced. Lapierre married Nicole Beaulieu in 1989.

Early political career

Liberal 
Lapierre was elected to the House of Commons in 1978, serving from 1979 to 1993, representing the riding of Shefford, Quebec. He sat as a Liberal from 1979 to 1990. Lapierre was a Quebec federalist; together with Pierre Trudeau, he opposed the 1980 Quebec referendum alternative to establish sovereignty for the province. In the first referendum on the place of Quebec in Canada, continued federal status won by nearly 60 per cent of the vote. In this period, the government officially recognized French as an official language of equal status with English in government. Federal government operations and documents, signs, etc. are required to be published and accessible in both languages.

After Trudeau retired from politics in 1984, he was succeeded as Prime Minister and party leader by John Turner. Turner appointed Lapierre at age 28 to cabinet (at the time, the youngest minister to serve in a federal cabinet) as minister of state for youth and amateur sport. Lapierre's tenure was brief as Turner called an election nine days after being sworn in, and the Liberals lost.

Lapierre was a strong proponent of the Meech Lake Accord, and Turner and Martin also expressed support for it. Trudeau publicly campaigned against it, and Jean Chrétien opposed it as well.

Bloc Québécois 
Upon leaving the Liberals, Lapierre sat as an independent, helping to found the Bloc Québécois and serving in their first caucus. In 1992, he retired from politics for a time and abandoned his affiliation with the Bloc. Lapierre has said that he never fully identified as a separatist and was the "red of the rainbow" in a temporary ad hoc rainbow coalition. He wanted to gain a level playing field for Quebec.

Broadcaster 
In private life, Lapierre was well known in Quebec as a broadcaster and talk show host for Montreal radio station CKAC. He also worked simultaneously as a TV news presenter for a time.

Return to Liberals 
Lapierre never fully gave up his political ambitions or his personal loyalty to Paul Martin. When the latter became liberal leader in December 2003, Lapierre returned to party politics after a decade away.

Martin appointed Lapierre as his Quebec lieutenant. He had a different style from his predecessors, most of whom were cautious, soft-spoken, and mindful of the effects of their Quebec actions on the rest of Canada. By contrast, Lapierre had what a CBC commentator described as a "rough and tumble, shoot from the hip style of politics", being known for his flamboyance, aggressiveness, toughness, rudeness and arrogance.

News analysts questioned the need for a Quebec lieutenant, as Martin was bilingual. In addition, polls showed fading support for the Bloc Québécois and Parti Québécois (who lost the 2003 provincial election), suggesting less need for a lieutenant. Others believed that Martin placed high importance on Quebec, hoping to fare significantly better than Chrétien had. He considered Lapierre to be crucial to winning over part of the nationalist vote.

2004 federal election 
In the 2004 federal election, Lapierre was expected to deliver the vote in Quebec, but this was difficult following the sponsorship scandal of the Liberal Party. The scandal severely hurt the party's support, especially in that province, while the rival Bloc Québécois gained support. Lapierre said that it would help the Liberals if the Royal Canadian Mounted Police could "lay some charges already" in the sponsorship probe.

Years later, Lapierre said the sponsorship scandal had damaged the party like getting hit by a Mack truck. When Bloc Québécois leader Gilles Duceppe tried to link Liza Frulla to the Sponsorship Scandal, saying that her 2002 by-election campaign was funded by members implicated in the scandal, Lapierre described it as "the cheapest thing you can do—try to start gossip that has no foundation".

The Liberals were able to retain a plurality of seats to continue governing, but they were reduced to a minority. In Quebec, they lost 15 of the 36 seats won in 2000, and their popular vote fell from 44 to 34 per cent, while the Bloc Québécois captured 54 of the 75 seats.

Minister of Transport 
As Minister of Transport, Lapierre initiated the Pacific Gateway Strategy, signing air transport agreements with China and India and completed a formal Canada-US Open Skies Agreement.  He also spearheaded a large federal investment in the Prince Rupert container terminal, saying that it improved ties to Asian markets, while enhancing economic development in northern British Columbia and Alberta. Lapierre reduced the amount paid by airports to the federal government by some $5 billion over the remaining life of the leases. He announced the implementation of a No Fly List to increase security for airline passengers.

As Transport Minister, his predecessor Tony Valeri had dismissed VIA Rail chairman Jean Pelletier, who filed a lawsuit against the government charging it had failed to use due process. A federal court ruled in his favor in November 2005 after the change in administrations, ordering Pelletier to be reinstated. The government appealed the court ruling and kept the former chair off the payroll. Lapierre ensured that due process was followed in dismissing Pelletier a second time. But in March 2007, Justice Francois Lemieux ruled that the Martin government acted improperly in 2005 when it fired Pelletier a second time, immediately after a court had overturned his first dismissal, stating that Lapierre was biased and failed to follow proper procedures.
On November 22, 2007, Judge Hélène Langlois of Quebec Superior Court ruled that government of then-Prime Minister Paul Martin had acted in a "cavalier and precipitous" fashion when it fired Pelletier. The court awarded Pelletier $235,000 in lost income, and a further $100,000 in damages.

Lapierre and his department were criticised for their handling of the collapse of the carrier Jetsgo.  Critics said that he should have seen warning signs after unsuccessful attempts to lower the carrier's costs. They also said that he had failed to warn the public or intervene, making him indirectly responsible when thousands of travelers were stranded when the carrier stopped operations. Lapierre rejected calls to resign, and denied that he had any knowledge of the collapse. He pointed out that most of the passengers had booked flights with credit cards and would be eligible for refunds.

Opposition 
Lapierre retained his position as Quebec lieutenant for the 2006 election. He was personally re-elected without much difficulty, though with a reduced margin. But, the Liberals lost power in the campaign, falling from 21 to 13 seats in Quebec. They were surpassed by the Conservatives in the popular vote.

Paul Martin resigned as parliamentary leader on election night, and as party leader a month later. Interim successor Bill Graham appointed Lapierre to his shadow cabinet as Industry critic.

Lapierre was neutral at the 2006 Liberal leadership election, where Stéphane Dion was elected Liberal leader. Lapierre afterwards planned to announce that he would not run for re-election in Outremont, saying that his "commitment was to Mr. Martin for one mandate." Lapierre commented that Dion was the first leader not to have to cope with a divided party, after decades of infighting between Trudeau/Turner and Chrétien/Martin.

Return to broadcasting 
On January 11, 2007, Lapierre announced that he would retire from political office at the end of the month. He did so on January 28, 2007.

He started work as a political analyst with Quebec television network TVA and Montreal radio station 98.5 FM. He co-hosted a political show with reporter Paul Larocque: Larocque-Lapierre. He was also political commentator for CJAD and FM 98.5 radio in Montreal, and FM 93 in Quebec city. He contributed regularly to Power Play and Question Period on the CTV network.

In 2014, Lapierre was coauthor with Chantal Hébert of the non-fiction book The Morning After: The 1995 Quebec Referendum and the Day that Almost Was. It was a shortlisted nominee for the 2015 Shaughnessy Cohen Prize for Political Writing.

Death 

On March 29, 2016, Jean Lapierre died in a plane crash short of the airport in the Magdalen Islands. All seven travelers on board died, including his wife Nicole Beaulieu, sister Martine Lapierre, and brothers Marc and Louis Lapierre. The family was en route to the funeral of Lapierre's father, Raymond C. Lapierre, who had died a few days earlier. All of the Lapierre family members were honored in a service at Les Îles-de-la-Madeleine in early April. They are survived by Marie-Anne and Jean-Michel Lapierre, children of Jean and his first wife, Gabrielle Choinière; and Lucie Lapierre, Raymond's widow.

Lapierre and Beaulieu were given a funeral at Saint-Viateur d'Outremont church in Montreal on April 16, 2016, attended by extended family, friends, political and broadcasting colleagues, and dignitaries including Prime Minister Justin Trudeau and his wife Sophie Gregoire Trudeau. His daughter Marie-Anne Lapierre gave the eulogy.

The plane that crashed with Lapierre and six other people aboard was travelling faster and at a higher altitude than recommended,
the federal Transportation Safety Board stated. The agency said that the plane crashed short of the airport soon after the pilot turned off the autopilot and lowered the landing gear.  Almost immediately afterwards, the Mitsubishi MU-2B-60 aircraft "rolled quickly into a steep right bank and descended rapidly" before smashing to the ground.

Honours

Electoral record 

Source: Official Results, Elections Canada and Financial Returns, Elections Canada.

Archives 
There is a Jean Lapierre fonds at Library and Archives Canada.

References

External links 

1956 births
2016 deaths
Canadian Ministers of Transport
Canadian television hosts
Canadian radio personalities
Liberal Party of Canada MPs
Bloc Québécois MPs
Members of the House of Commons of Canada from Quebec
Members of the King's Privy Council for Canada
Quebec lieutenants
Lawyers in Quebec
University of Ottawa alumni
Members of the 23rd Canadian Ministry
Members of the 27th Canadian Ministry
Accidental deaths in Quebec
Victims of aviation accidents or incidents in Canada
Victims of aviation accidents or incidents in 2016
University of Ottawa Faculty of Law alumni